

Results

References
 Official results

Women's 3 metre synchro springboard
Euro